Back station is a flag stop railway station in Back, Manitoba. The station is served by Via Rail's Winnipeg–Churchill train.

Footnotes

External links 
Government of Manitoba Regional Map

Via Rail stations in Manitoba